Green Team is an independent strategic brand communications and creative agency with offices in New York, Sydney, Melbourne, Hobart, São Paulo and Mexico City. Founded in 1993, it is one of the first communications agencies to focus on the areas of sustainability and social responsibility.

Green Team's mission statement is "We consider the environment to include every social, natural and cultural surrounding that impacts the health of our minds, bodies and spirits. So defined, museums and marshlands are equally critical habitats; workplace diversity and World Heritage sites are both in need of preservation; and racial discrimination is just as toxic as diesel fumes."

Green Team president Hugh Hough was chosen as one of Al Gore's ambassadors for the Inconvenient Truth film in 2007.

Awakening Consumer

Green Team coined the term 'Awakening Consumer', relating to consumers that consider a company's or brand's values in addition to the price/performance ratio, when making a purchase. The Awakening Consumer demographic is similar, though more expansive, to the market segment designated LOHAS.

Green Team Australia

Green Team Australia was established in 2007. Independently owned and operated, it has offices located in Sydney, Melbourne and Hobart. Heather Rose, a director of Green Team Australia, is a businesswoman and author in Australia.

External links
"The Sky May Not Be Falling, But The Ground Is Definitely Shifting ", MediaPost, May 13, 2009
"Finding Success in a Green World", AirTran Magazine, February 2009
"A Garbage Hauler Tidies Up Its Image" New York Times, February 7, 2008
"Fine-Tuning the Green Rush" Corporate Responsibility Officer, December 2007
"Art & Commerce: Awake and Aware" Adweek, October 22, 2007
"Greenwashing, Be Gone! A tool to help companies assess their eco-friendliness" BusinessWeek September 4, 2007
"The New Black; Companies and Critics Try Collaboration" New York Times, May 17, 2006
"Green Team Rolls Out Monaco's Red Carpet" Adweek, February 25, 2005
"Green Team Debuts Resort for 'Fortunate Few'" Adweek, October 5, 2004
"Environmental Defense Goes on Offense " Adweek, July 30, 2004
"Green Team Creates 'Cut the Emissions' Ads" Adweek, June 4, 2004
"Green Team Takes Over VisitBritain" Adweek, May 10, 2004
"An agency makes progress by roughing it in a field with few competitors: environmental issues." New York Times, August 8, 1995

Advertising agencies of the United States
Companies based in New York City